Deep Karki (born 09 January 1998) is a Nepalese professional footballer who plays as a goalkeeper for Martyr's Memorial A-Division League club Himalayan Sherpa Club and the Nepal national team.

International career
Karki made his international debut against Jordan on 9 June 2022 in 2023 AFC Asian Cup qualifier, despite being regular National team member since 2019.

References 

Living people
1998 births
People from Dolakha District
Nepalese footballers
Nepal international footballers
Association football goalkeepers
Asian Games competitors for Nepal